The Eurovision Song Contest 2014 was the 59th edition of the Eurovision Song Contest. Organised by the European Broadcasting Union (EBU) and host broadcaster Danish Broadcasting Corporation (DR), the contest was held at B&W Hallerne, and consisted of two semi-finals on 6 and 8 May, and a final on 10 May 2014.
The three live shows were presented by Danish television presenter Lise Rønne, musician Nikolaj Koppel and actor Pilou Asbæk.

Overall, there were two fewer countries competing compared to the previous year, making thirty-seven participants, the smallest number since 2006.

The winner was Austria with the song "Rise Like a Phoenix", performed by Conchita Wurst and written by Charley Mason, Joey Patulka, Ali Zuckowski, and Julian Maas. Austria's victory was the longest gap between victories for any country at the time - 48 years, not having won since . Of the "Big Five" countries, only Spain achieved a place in the top ten, while France finished in last place for the first time in their Eurovision history. Meanwhile,  and  both qualified for the final for the first time.

A new record of 195 million viewers for the contest was reported.

The official compilation album of the 2014 contest was released by Universal Music Group on 14 April 2014, and featured all 37 songs from the contest, including the official #JoinUs theme performed during the interval act of the final. The host broadcaster, DR, and the EBU won the International TV Award at the Ondas Awards for their production of the contest.
The show organisers from Copenhagen spent in total 112 million Danish kroner on the contest; three times more than what was expected and were furthermore highly accused of cases of nepotism within the organisation.

Location 

The contest was held at the former shipyard Refshaleøen, in the B&W Hallerne in Copenhagen, with the social networking hashtag "#JoinUs" as the motto. The location had been refurbished to accommodate the event, with the surrounding area transformed into "Eurovision Island"—an Olympic Park-inspired complex housing the event venue, press centre, and other amenities.

The mayor of Copenhagen, Frank Jensen, declared in late August that the city would contribute to the budget with 40 million (Danish Kroner). He also announced that the aim was to make the Eurovision 2014 into the greenest contest to date since Copenhagen had been elected European Green Capital for 2014.

Bidding phase 
Five cities had been considered as host city of the contest, including Herning and Copenhagen, both favourites to be the next host. The Parken Stadium, located in Copenhagen, which hosted the  contest and Jyske Bank Boxen in Herning, which hosted the Dansk Melodi Grand Prix 2013 final, were the first venues to join the bidding phase. Later, Fredericia and Aalborg entered the phase with the Messe C and Gigantium venues, respectively. The fifth city to join the phase was Horsens, with the venue being the courtyard of the former Horsens State Prison. In the event that Horsens had been chosen to host the contest, the courtyard would have been covered by a permanent glass roof. The contest was provisionally set to take place on 13, 15 and 17 May 2014, however, the dates were later brought forward a week in order to accommodate the candidate cities.

On 17 June 2013, the municipality executive of Aalborg decided not to bid for hosting the contest due to the city's lack of sufficient hotel capacity. While DR required the host city to have at least 3,000 hotel rooms, the city of Aalborg had only 1,600 hotel rooms, more than half of which had been booked for other events taking place at the same time as the Eurovision Song Contest. On 18 June 2013, DR announced that formal bids on hosting the contest had been received by the municipalities of Copenhagen, Herning and Horsens, and that the Municipality of Fredericia had confirmed its intention to place a formal bid, too.

On 19 June 2013, the deadline for placing bids on hosting the contest, it was reported that Wonderful Copenhagen, the official convention, event and visitors bureau of the Greater Copenhagen area, had proposed three venues in its bid on hosting the contest: The Parken Stadium, a large tent on the grounds of DR Byen and the B&W Hallerne. On 25 June 2013, the Municipality of Fredericia announced that the Triangle Region had withdrawn its bid on hosting the contest, due to the lack of a suitable venue. DR required the hosting venue to have no pillars blocking any views and an interior height of at least 16 metres. However, no venues in the region met those requirements and, therefore, Fredericia was no longer in the running for becoming host city of the 2014 Eurovision Song Contest. On 28 June 2013, Anders Hørsholt, CEO of Parken Sport & Entertainment, stated that the Parken Stadium was no longer in the running for hosting the contest due to several football matches having already been scheduled to take place at the stadium in the weeks leading up to the contest.

On 2 September 2013, the Danish broadcaster DR announced that it had chosen Copenhagen as the host city for the 2014 contest, with B&W Hallerne chosen as the host venue.

Key

 Host venue

Other sites 

The Eurovision Village was the official Eurovision Song Contest fan and sponsors' area during the events week. There it was possible to watch performances by local artists, as well as the live shows broadcast from the main venue. Located at the Nytorv Square, it was open from 4 to 11 May 2014.

The EuroClub was the venue for the official after-parties and private performances by contest participants. Unlike the Eurovision Village, access to the EuroClub was restricted to accredited fans, delegates, and press. It was located at VEGA CPH Music Club.

The "Red Carpet" event, where the contestants and their delegations are presented before the accredited press and fans, took place at Copenhagen City Hall on 4 May 2014 at 17:00 CET, followed by the Opening Ceremony.

Format 

The competition consisted of two semi-finals and a final, a format which has been in use since 2008. The ten countries with the highest scores in each semi-final qualified to the final where they joined the host nation Denmark and the five main sponsoring nations (known as the Big Five): France, Germany, Italy, Spain and the United Kingdom.

Each participating country had their own national jury, which consisted of five professional members of the music industry.
Each member of a respective nation's jury was required to rank every song, except that of their own country. The voting results from each member of a particular nation's jury were combined to produce an overall ranking from first to last place. Likewise, the televoting results were also interpreted as a full ranking, taking into account the full televoting result rather than just the top ten. The combination of the jury's full ranking and the televote's full ranking produced an overall ranking of all competing entries. The song which scored the highest overall rank received 12 points, while the tenth-best ranked song received 1-point. In the event of a televoting (insufficient number of votes/technical issues) or jury failure (technical issue/breach of rules), only a jury/televoting was used by each country.

On 20 September 2013, the EBU released the official rules for the 2014 contest, which introduced rule changes regarding the jury voting. The rules aimed at providing more transparency regarding each five member national jury by releasing the names of all jurors on 1 May 2014 prior to the start of the contest and providing each juror's full ranking results after the conclusion of the contest. In addition, jury members on a particular nation's jury can only serve as a juror if they have not already participated as such in one of the preceding two contest editions.

Semi-final allocation draw 
The draw that determined the semi-final allocation was held on 20 January 2014 at the Copenhagen City Hall. Prior to the allocation draw, on 24 November 2013 it was announced that Norway and Sweden would perform in different semi-finals in order to maximise the availability of tickets for visitors from both countries. A draw at the EBU headquarters determined that Sweden would perform in the first semi-final, while Norway would perform in the second semi-final. The EBU also allocated Israel to the second semi-final after a request from the delegation in order to avoid complications with its Independence Day coinciding with the date of the first semi-final. The remaining participating countries, excluding the automatic finalists (Denmark, France, Germany, Italy, Spain and the United Kingdom), were split into six pots, based on voting patterns from the previous ten years.

The pots were calculated by the televoting partner Digame and were as follows:

Running order 
As in 2013, the host broadcaster DR and their producers determined the running order for each show with only the starting position of the host nation being determined by draw. A draw which took place during the heads of delegation meeting on 17 March 2014 in Copenhagen determined that Denmark would perform 23rd in the final. On 24 March 2014, the running order for the two semi-finals was released. Prior to the creation of the running order for the final, an allocation draw was held during the semi-final winners press conferences following the conclusion of each semi-final and during the individual press conferences on 6 May 2014 for the Big Five (France, Germany, Italy, Spain and the United Kingdom). The draw determined whether the country would perform in the first or second half of the final. The producers published the final running order shortly before 02:00 (CEST) on 9 May 2014. Ukraine were chosen to perform first, whilst the United Kingdom were chosen to perform last.

Crimea 
The contest was held in the immediate aftermath of the 2014 Ukrainian revolution and subsequent annexation of Crimea by Russia. Votes cast through Ukrainian telecom providers which service Crimea were counted towards Ukraine's votes.

Graphic design 
The graphic design of the contest was revealed by the EBU on 18 December 2013. The theme art comprises a blue and purple diamond, within it the generic Eurovision Song Contest logo featuring the Danish flag as well as the hashtag and slogan "#JoinUs" at the centre of the diamond.

The postcards used to introduce a country and their participants were shot in their respective countries and featured the artists using unique ways to create their country's flag, e.g. the postcard for the United Kingdom features Molly creating the Union Flag from AEC Routemaster buses, Royal Mail vans, and people wearing blue raincoats along with strips of red and white paper, and the postcard for Denmark features Basim and his singers using old furniture and red and white paint to paint the Danish flag. The postcards then ended with the act taking a picture on a camera or phone and a close up of the resulting artwork was shown onscreen. The flag created by the artist(s) is then captured into a diamond and transitions to the official flag.

National host broadcaster 
Pernille Gaardbo was appointed by DR's Director-General Maria Rørbye Rønn as the executive producer for the contest, three-days after Denmark's victory at the 2013 contest. Maria Rørbye Rønn stated in an interview that "By choosing Pernille Gaardbo, we have a person who has all the necessary leadership skills, which are essential in order to run a project of this magnitude, and the technical insight for such a large TV-production, which the Eurovision Song Contest is". Gaardbo has worked for the host broadcaster for 17 years, 12 of which was in the role of supervisor of the DR Medieservice.

Danish royal family members Crown Prince Frederik and Crown Princess Mary attended the final as invited guests. In March 2014, host broadcaster DR invited Jessica Mauboy to perform during the interval act of the second semi-final on 8 May 2014, part of DR's recognition of Australia's dedication to the contest. Mauboy performed the song "Sea of Flags" during the interval act.

Participating countries 

However,  broadcaster Bulgarian National Television (BNT),  broadcaster Hrvatska radiotelevizija (HRT),  broadcaster Cyprus Broadcasting Corporation (CyBC) and  broadcaster Radio Television of Serbia (RTS) did not participate in the 2014 contest.

Returning artists 
Valentina Monetta represented  for a third and final consecutive year, having previously represented the microstate at the 2012 and 2013 contests.

Paula Seling and Ovi returned as a duo, having previously represented Romania in 2010.

The Tolmachevy Sisters, who represented Russia, previously participated in and won the Junior Eurovision Song Contest 2006.

Macedonian backing vocalist Tamara Todevska previously represented Macedonia in 2008. She would later represent Macedonia again in the Eurovision Song Contest 2019.

Martina Majerle, who represented Slovenia in 2009 and provided backing vocals numerous times for Croatia (2003), Montenegro (2008) and Slovenia (2007, 2011, 2012), returned as a backing vocalist for Montenegro.

Semi-final 1 
Spain, France, and Denmark voted in this semi-final.

Semi-final 2 
Germany, Italy, and the United Kingdom voted in this semi-final.

Final
As in the 2013 contest, the winner was announced as soon as it was mathematically impossible to catch up. In this case, the winner had been determined by the 34th vote out of the 37, which came from Ukraine.

Detailed voting results 

Full results including televoting and results from the individual jury members were released shortly after the final.

Semi-final 1
Albania, Montenegro, San Marino and Moldova used juries due to an inability to provide televoting results.

12 points 
Below is a summary of the maximum 12 points each country awarded to another in the first semifinal:

Semi-final 2 

Georgia and Macedonia used juries due to either technical issues with the televoting or an insufficient number of votes cast during the televote period.

12 points 
Below is a summary of the maximum 12 points each country awarded to another in the second semifinal:

Final

12 points 
Below is a summary of the maximum 12 points each country awarded to another in the Grand Final:

Spokespersons 
The order in which each country announced their votes was determined in a draw following the jury results from the final dress rehearsal. An algorithm implemented by NRK, based on jury vote, was used to generate as much suspense as possible. The spokespersons are shown alongside each country.

 Sabina Babayeva
 Andrianna Maggania
 
 Andri Xhahu
 Michele Perniola
 
 Tijana Mišković
 Sonia Argint-Ionescu
 Alsou
 Tim Douwsma
 Valentina Rossi
 Élodie Suigo
 Scott Mills
 Ralfs Eilands
 
 Benedict Valsson
 Marko Mark
 Alcazar
 Alyona Lanskaya
 Helene Fischer
 
 Joana Teles
 Margrethe Røed
 Lauri Pihlap
 Éva Novodomszky
 Olivia Furtuna
 Nicky Byrne
 Redrama
 Ignas Krupavičius
 Kati Bellowitsch
 
 Angelique Vlieghe
 Linus
 Zlata Ognevich
 
 Sophie Gelovani and Nodi Tatishvili

Other countries 

Eligibility for potential participation in the Eurovision Song Contest requires a national broadcaster with active EBU membership that would be able to broadcast the contest via the Eurovision network. The EBU issued an invitation to participate in the contest to all active members.

Active EBU members
  – The Andorran broadcaster Ràdio i Televisió d'Andorra (RTVA) informed a Eurovision news website that due to financial reasons and budget constraints, Andorra would not return to the contest in 2014.
  – Despite the Bosnian broadcaster Radio and Television of Bosnia and Herzegovina (BHRT) initially stating their intention to participate in the contest, on 18 December 2013 it was announced that they would not be taking part due to a lack of sponsorship.
  – Despite initial indications that Bulgarian broadcaster Bulgarian National Television (BNT) had planned to participate in the 2014 contest, on 22 November 2013, BNT announced their non-participation in the competition, citing an expensive participation fee and limited funds due to budget cuts as reasons for this decision.
  – On 3 October 2013, the Cypriot broadcaster Cyprus Broadcasting Corporation (CyBC) announced that it would not enter in the 2014 contest, citing public opinion regarding the 2012–13 Cypriot financial crisis and budget restrictions as factors that influenced this decision.
  – The Czech broadcaster Česká televize (ČT) confirmed on 30 September 2013, that they would not return to the contest in 2014, citing low viewing figures and poor results as their reason.
  – The chief executive officer of RTL Télé Lëtzebuerg, Alain Berwick, stated that Luxembourg would not return to the contest, citing the potential financial burden of hosting the contest and a lack of public interest as reasons for this decision. The broadcaster further confirmed on 24 July 2013, that Luxembourg would not be participating in the 2014 contest.
  – The Monegasque broadcaster Télé Monte Carlo (TMC) informed a Eurovision news website that Monaco would not be returning to the contest in 2014.
  – On 11 September 2013, Moroccan broadcaster Société Nationale de Radiodiffusion et de Télévision (SNRT) informed and confirmed to a Eurovision news website that they have not ruled out the possibility of making a comeback in the near future, but currently have no plans to make their return at the 2014 contest.
  – On 22 November 2013, Serbian broadcaster Radio Television of Serbia (RTS) announced that it would not participate the 2014 contest due to financial difficulties and a lack of available sponsorship for a potential Serbian entry.
  – Slovakian broadcaster Rozhlas a televízia Slovenska (RTVS) announced through their official Twitter feed on 1 September 2013 that Slovakia would not participate in the 2014 contest. The non-participation was further confirmed on 9 September 2013.
  – On 14 September 2013, the general director of Türkiye Radyo ve Televizyon Kurumu (TRT), İbrahim Şahin, stated that there are no plans to return to the contest under the current conditions. Dissatisfaction with the introduction of a mixed jury/televote voting system and the current status of the "Big Five" were once again cited as reasons for this decision. The non-participation was further confirmed on 7 November 2013.

Non-EBU members
 – While Kosovan broadcaster Radio Television of Kosovo (RTK) did not voice any intention regarding the 2014 contest, Kosovo's Deputy Minister of Foreign Affairs Petrit Selimi told the Swedish television programme Korrespondenterna that he thought Kosovo, whose status is disputed, would be granted EBU membership and acceptance into the Eurovision in time for the 2014 edition. However, Kosovo has not been recognized as an independent country by the International Telecommunication Union, which is a requirement for full membership in the EBU.
 – Broadcaster 1 Fürstentum Liechtenstein Television (1FLTV) had originally intended to participate in the 2013 contest, pending subsidies being sought from the Liechtenstein government in order to join the EBU. However such financial offerings were never granted.  The broadcaster at the time had stated that they would try again with the aim to make their debut in 2014. On 10 September 2013, 1FLTV announced that they will not be present at any foreseeable Eurovision Song Contest until such financial support has been granted by the government of Liechtenstein.

Broadcasts 

Most countries sent commentators to Copenhagen or commentated from their own country, in order to add insight to the participants and, if necessary, the provision of voting information.

It was reported by the EBU that the 2014 contest was viewed by a worldwide television audience of a record breaking 195 million viewers.

Incidents

Armenian contestant's statements
On the week of the contest, Armenian contestant Aram Mp3 commented on Conchita Wurst's image by saying that her lifestyle was "not natural" and that she needed to decide to be either a woman or a man. The statement sparked controversy, following which Aram Mp3 apologised and added that what he said was meant to be a joke. Wurst accepted the apology, by stating, "I have to say that if it's a joke it's not funny... but he apologised and that's fine for me."

Georgia jury votes
Georgia's jury votes in the Grand Final were all declared invalid, as all the jury members had voted exactly the same from 3 points up to 12 points. According to EBU, this constitutes a statistical impossibility. Therefore, only Georgia's televoting result was used for the distribution of the Georgian points in the Grand Final.

Lithuanian spokesperson's commentary
Lithuanian spokesperson Ignas Krupavičius, just before announcing that ten points of his country's vote had been assigned to Conchita Wurst, referred to Wurst's beard in saying "Now it is time to shave", then pulled out a razor and pretended to shave his own face, before giggling at the joke. Host Nikolaj Koppel replied "Time to shave? I think not.", because the next country to announce the votes was Austria. British commentator Graham Norton also expressed his frustration at the joke and supported Koppel's reply.

Reaction to Russia's performance

Russia's Tolmachevy Sisters were the subject of booing from the audience, during the semi-final and when they were announced to have qualified for the final. Russia's act were also booed during the final; and when the Russian spokesperson delivered their top-three votes. The booing was also heard when countries awarded points to Russia, including neighbouring countries such as Azerbaijan and Belarus.

Fraser Nelson, editor of The Spectator magazine, wrote: "I can’t remember the last time I heard a Eurovision audience boo anyone; during the Iraq war in 2003, no one booed Britain. [...] There’s a difference between the Russian government and the Russian people, and the girls were there to represent the latter. They didn’t deserve the obloquy. And the Danes were wrong to have made the booing so audible."

Internet activist security breach
After Conchita Wurst had won and performed the song again, and shortly before the end of the television broadcast, press photographers crowded around Wurst for pictures. During the photo session, Estonian "Free Anakata" activist Meelis Kaldalu managed to breach security and approach Wurst, giving her flowers and a Danish flag. She accepted the flowers, and Kaldalu knelt before her; what he said could not be heard. As security personnel realised Kaldalu was not supposed to be there, they began to drag him away, and Kaldalu produced a piece of paper, which he had hidden under his shirt, reading "#free anakata".

Other awards 
In addition to the main winner's trophy, the Marcel Bezençon Awards and the Barbara Dex Award were contested during the 2014 Eurovision Song Contest. The OGAE, "General Organisation of Eurovision Fans" voting poll also took place before the contest. The Premios Ondas (English: Wave Awards) have honoured the production values of the Eurovision Song Contest 2014 in one of their categories.

Marcel Bezençon Awards 
The Marcel Bezençon Awards, organised since 2002 by Sweden's then-Head of Delegation and 1992 representative Christer Björkman, and 1984 winner Richard Herrey, honours songs in the contest's final. The awards are divided into three categories: Artistic Award, Composers Award, and Press Award.

OGAE 
OGAE, an organisation of over forty Eurovision Song Contest fan clubs across Europe and beyond, conducts an annual voting poll first held in 2002 as the Marcel Bezençon Fan Award. After all votes were cast, the top-ranked entry in the 2014 poll was "Undo" performed by Sanna Nielsen; the top five results are shown below.

Barbara Dex Award
The Barbara Dex Award is a humorous fan award given to the worst dressed artist each year. Named after Belgium's representative who came last in the 1993 contest, wearing her self-designed dress, the award was handed by the fansite House of Eurovision from 1997 to 2016 and is being carried out by the fansite songfestival.be since 2017.

Ondas Awards

Premios Ondas is an award ceremony organised by Radio Barcelona, a subsidiary of Cadena SER, since 1954. They are awarded in recognition of professionals in the fields of radio and television broadcasting, the cinema, and the music industry. The 61st Ondas Award recipients were announced on 6 November 2014, where Danish broadcaster DR, and the European Broadcasting Union received the International Television Award, for their production of the 2014 Eurovision Song Contest. The award was handed over on 25 November 2014 at the Liceu in Barcelona.

|-
! scope="row" | 2014
| DR – European Broadcasting Union
| International Television Award
| 
|}

Official album

Eurovision Song Contest: Copenhagen 2014 was the official compilation album of the 2014 contest, put together by the European Broadcasting Union and released by Universal Music Group on 14 April 2014. The album featured all 37 songs that entered in the 2014 contest, including the semi-finalists that failed to qualify into the grand final.  It also featured the official #JoinUs theme "Rainmaker", performed by the  contest winner Emmelie de Forest.

Charts

See also 
ABU Radio Song Festival 2014
ABU TV Song Festival 2014
Junior Eurovision Song Contest 2014
Türkvizyon Song Contest 2014
List of jurors of the Eurovision Song Contest 2014

Notes

References

External links 

Official rules for 2014

 
2014
Music festivals in Denmark
Culture in Copenhagen
2014 in Danish music
2014 song contests
2014 in Copenhagen
May 2014 events in Europe
2014 in Danish television
Events in Copenhagen